Faughanvale railway station served the village of Faughanvale in County Londonderry, Northern Ireland.

The Londonderry and Coleraine Railway opened the station on 1 May 1855.

It closed on 1 April 1859.

Routes

References

Disused railway stations in County Londonderry
Railway stations opened in 1855
Railway stations closed in 1859
1855 establishments in Ireland
Railway stations in Northern Ireland opened in the 19th century